Sadi Jorge Cuellar Maire (born 26 December 1963 in Yacuiba, Tarija), known as Yalo Cuéllar, is a Bolivian composer and musician.

References

External links
 Official website

1963 births
Living people
People from Gran Chaco Province
Bolivian composers